Hongniang, or Scarlet, is a fictional character from "Yingying's Biography", a Chinese story by Yuan Zhen (779–831), and Romance of the Western Chamber, a Chinese play by Wang Shifu (1250–1337?). She is the maidservant of Cui Yingying. In Yuan Zhen's story, she doesn't play an important role, but in Wang Shifu's play, Hongniang figures prominently. Intelligent, sympathetic, loyal, and highly enthusiastic, it is Hongniang who made Cui Yingying and Scholar Zhang (Zhang Gong) fall in love, and it is she who made their marriage happen. Hongniang has entered modern Chinese vocabulary as a synonym for a (female) matchmaker.

Fictional Tang dynasty people